Nemea may refer to:

 Nemea, an ancient sanctuary and archaeological site in Greece, known for the Nemean lion
 Nemea (town), a town and municipality in Greece
A wine region near the town of Nemea known for its red wine
Nemea (mythology):Greek nymph
 Néméa (also known as Fiametta), a ballet in four acts by Arthur Saint-Léon to the music of Ludwig Minkus (1863/1864)
 Archaia Nemea, a village near Nemea in Greece
 Nemea, a genus of moths of the family Thyrididae
 Nemea Bank plc, a pan-European bank domiciled in Malta